Alejandro Aurelio Aguinaga Recuenco (born 28 January 1950) is a Peruvian doctor and Fujimorist politician. He is a Congressman, representing the Lambayeque Region, as he was before between 2006 and 2016. He was also the Health Minister during the administration of Alberto Fujimori from 1999 to 2000.

Education and career 
After eight years of studies since 1966, Aguinaga graduated from the Universidad Nacional Federico Villarreal in Lima with a medical degree, in 1975. From 1977 to 1979, he furthered his qualification at the National University of San Marcos, specializing in general and digestive system surgery. From 1981 to 1985, he attended a post-gradual training in gastrointestinal surgery at the Louis Pasteur University in Strasbourg, France. From 1985 to 2006 he practiced at the Archbishop Loayza Hospital in Lima, starting as an assistant surgeon and later gaining promotion to general director. As a professor, he has lectured about surgery at the Cayetano Heredia University, the Universidad de San Martín de Porres, and the private University San Juan Bautista. Additionally, he became the personal doctor of then-president Alberto Fujimori.

Political career

Early political career 
During the Fujimori's administration, he held the post of deputy minister of health from 1994 to 1999 and eventually he became minister heading the same ministry from 1999 to 2000.

Congressman 
In the 2006 elections, Aguinaga was elected Congressman on the Fujimorist Alliance for the Future list as an invited candidate, representing the Lambayeque Region. In 2007, he assumed the presidency of the Foreign Relations Committee of the Congress of the Republic in which he served from 26 July 2007 to 26 July 2008. During 2008 and 2009, he was the First Vice President of the Congress under the leadership of Javier Velásquez. When Velasquez was appointed Prime Minister in July 2009, Aguinaga took over the interim Presidency of the Congress for a few days until 26 July when Congress elected Luis Alva Castro. During the Congressional leadership of César Zumaeta, Aguinaga was once again, the First Vice President of the Congress. In the 2011 elections, Aguinaga was re-elected for another five-year term, this time under the Force 2011 party of Fujimori's daughter Keiko. In 2021, Aguinaga is set to return to Congress, after a five-year absence.

References

External links

Official Congressional Site (2006 term)
 Congressional site (2011 term)
 Resume on the National Electoral Panel (JNE) site

Fujimorista politicians
Living people
1950 births
Peruvian people of Basque descent
Presidents of the Congress of the Republic of Peru
Peruvian surgeons
Federico Villarreal National University alumni
National University of San Marcos alumni
People from Trujillo, Peru

People from Trujillo Province, Peru